Peter Brotherton (born 4 February 1931) in Boston, Lincolnshire, is a former British racing cyclist. He competed in UK cycling time trials, road races and track cycling events. Following success, Brotherton was selected to represent Great Britain at the Commonwealth Games, World Championships & Olympic Games.

After competing at the  1956 Olympic Games held in Melbourne, Australia, along with his wife, they both decided to emigrate, and settled in Melbourne. He continued to compete, in track cycling carnival events, and in 1957, he won the Bendigo Golden Mile wheelrace, beating Russell Mockridge into second place. The following season (1958) he teamed up with Sid Patterson to win the Sydney  6 Day track cycling event. A change of partner (Don Burgess) and the Melbourne Milk  6 Day ended in a 3rd place finish. After retiring from cycle racing, Brotherton began building road and track cycle frames, using the brand name "Petrus".

Cycling results

References

1931 births
Living people
British male cyclists
Olympic cyclists of Great Britain
Cyclists at the 1956 Summer Olympics
People from Boston, Lincolnshire
Commonwealth Games medallists in cycling
Commonwealth Games silver medallists for England
Cyclists at the 1954 British Empire and Commonwealth Games
20th-century British people
Medallists at the 1954 British Empire and Commonwealth Games